Parliamentary elections were held in Estonia between 11 and 13 May 1929.

Results

See also
IV Riigikogu

References

IV Riigikogu valimised : 11.-13. maini 1929 / [koostanud A. Tooms] ; Riigi Statistika Keskbüroo = Élections au parlement : de 11.-13. mai 1929 / Bureau Central de Statistique de l'Estonie  Tallinn, 1929 (Tallinn : Riigi trükikoda)

Parliamentary elections in Estonia
1929 in Estonia
Estonia
May 1929 events in Europe